Cycnoches pentadactylon is a species of  swan orchid native to Peru and Brazil.

References

pentadactylon
Orchids of Brazil
Orchids of Peru
Plants described in 1843